Radha Madhavam is a 1990 Indian Malayalam film, directed by Suresh Unnithan and produced by Ali. The film stars Jayaram, Thilakan, Geetha and Parvathy in the lead roles. The film has musical score by Vidyadharan.

Plot
Sudha, a young actress, is happy to be in a live-in relationship with an aged writer, Anadapadmanabhan. However, problems start brewing once Anadapadmanabhan's adopted son enters their lives.

Cast
Jayaram as Hari
Thilakan as N. S. Anadapadmanabhan
Geetha as Sudha 
Parvathy Jayaram as Ammu
Innocent as E. Chandhu Nair
KPAC Lalitha as Padmini
Shankaradi
Shammi Thilakan

Soundtrack
The music was composed by Vidyadharan.

References

External links
 

1990 films
1990s Malayalam-language films